Zábřeh  is a town in Šumperk District in the Olomouc Region of the Czech Republic. It has about 13,000 inhabitants.

Administrative parts
Villages of Dolní Bušínov, Hněvkov, Pivonín and Václavov are administrative parts of Zábřeh. Dolní Bušínov and Hněvkov form two exclaves of the municipal territory.

Etymology

The name Zábřeh is derived from za břehem, meaning "behind the riverbank". It is a reference to the river which flows through the town.

Hohenstadt is its former German name, meaning "high town". A name with the same meaning is used in Latin sources – Alta Civitas. The origin of this name is unclear, as the town is situated in lowlands.

Geography
The eastern half of the municipal territory lies in the Mohelnice Depression lowland and the second half lies on the hillside of the Zábřeh Highlands.

The Moravská Sázava River flows through the south of the town. Oborník pond is located in the built-up area.

History

The first written mention of Zábřeh is from 1254. It was most likely a settlement that was intended to protect the ford. A fortress was probably founded here together with the settlement. In 1278, Zábřeh was first referred to as a town.

From the mid-14th century until 1392, the Zábřeh estate was held by the Moravian branch of the Sternberg family, then shortly by Jobst of Moravia, who donated it to lords of Kravaře in 1397. In the late 14th or early 15th century, the local fortress was rebuilt into a castle.

In 1442, Jiří od Kravaře sold Zábřeh to the Tunkl of Brníčko family, who became the most significant owners of the town. It was the only aristocratic family that ever had its seat at Zábřeh Castle. They made Zábřeh the centre of one of the largest estates in Moravia. They had expanded and rebuilt the castle in the late Gothic style and established ponds here, of which only one has survived. They were also known for conflicts with neighbouring families and vassals.

In 1508, Jindřich Tunkl was forced to sell the whole estate to Mikuláš Trčka of Lípa due to large debts. Trčka of Lípa traded the estate with the Boskovic family in 1512, In the 16th century, the significance of Zábřeh declined. The Zábřeh Castle was renaissance rebuilt in the 1560s and 1570. The estate was inherited by the Zierotin family in 1589.

After the properties of the Zierotins were confiscated after the Battle of White Mountain, Zábřeh was acquired by the House of Liechtenstein, who owned it from 1622 until 1848. The Thirty Years' War affected Zábřeh mainly from the economic point of view, and the town never managed to return to its previous economic and cultural significance. The castle was partially baroque modified in 1661, then the northern Baroque wing was added in 1727–1736. After the abolition of the lordship system, the Baroque wing of the castle was sold by Aloys II, Prince of Liechtenstein to the town of Zábřeh.

After a devastating fire at the end of the 18th century, almost all the houses had to be rebuilt. In the first half 19th century the Prague–Olomouc railway was built through the town, and thus the current appearance of the town was created. After the railway station was built after 1845, Zábřeh became an important commercial and industrial centre of the region.

Until 1918, Hohenstadt – Zábřeh (German name only before 1867) was part of the Austrian monarchy (Austria side after the compromise of 1867), head of the district with the same name, one of the 34 Bezirkshauptmannschaften in Moravia.

In 1938, it was occupied by the Nazi Army as one of the municipalities in Sudetenland. Most Jews were killed during the Holocaust. The German speaking population was expelled in 1945 according to the Beneš decrees. Abandoned houses were taken over by Czechs from different parts of the country.

Demography
Zábřeh was originally a Czech town with a German minority and a Jewish community. The town became a border town of the linguistic border between German and Czech. In 1880 the town's majority was German-speaking, but after the Czech's successful claim to the whole of Bohemia, the town's majority was Czech-speaking by 1930.

Economy

Historically Zábřeh was a centre of textile industry profiting from its location next to the international railway. The large dyeing plant was founded here by the German industrialist Wilhelm Brass after 1870. After the World War II, the factory was nationalised and joined to the Perla national company. The textile production ended here in 2005.

Today, no major industrial companies are based in Zábřeh. The largest industrial company is HDO, which processes zinc alloy.

The Sulko factory produces plastic windows and doors. Part of the production is exported to west Europe. There is also a production plant of one of the largest Czech dairies, OLMA, owned by Agrofert. Fresh milk is processed here.

Zábřeh is situated in fertile lowland which is used for agricultural production. Maize, wheat, oilseed rape, poppy and fodder plant are grown. A tall silo is situated on the outskirts of the town.

Transport

The international railway corridor Prague–Zábřeh–Ostrava–Warsaw runs along the Moravská Sázava. The town's main railway station is named Zábřeh na Moravě (literally Zábřeh in Moravia) to distinguish it from the eponymous station in Dolní Benešov. There is also a railway station of local significance, Zábřeh na Moravě zastávka.

Culture
Zábřeh is located in the Haná ethnographic region.

Sights

The main landmark of Zábřeh is the castle. Since 1991, it has been used as the municipal office.

In the middle of the town square are a plague column from 1713 and a late Baroque fountain from 1829.

The parish Church of Saint Bartholomew was founded in the mid-13th century. Due to its poor condition it was demolished in 1750 and in 1754 the current baroque church was built in its site. The church tower houses a parish museum with displays of liturgical objects and a presentation on the history of bells. The second town's church, Church of Saint Barbara, was built in 1772.

The House Under The Arcades is one of the oldest houses in Zábřeh and one of the most valuable monuments. This Renaissance house from the 16th century was built on the site of two medieval houses, which were joined into one building. Today it houses the town museum.

Notable people
Josef Mik (1839–1900), entomologist
Jan Eskymo Welzl (1868–1948), traveller, adventurer, gold-digger and writer
Ctirad Kohoutek (1929–2011), composer
Luboš Kohoutek (born 1935), astronomer
Jaroslav Mostecký (born 1963), writer
Jiří Valík (born 1966), athlete
Ondřej Bank (born 1980), alpine skier
Pavel Pumprla (born 1986), basketball player
Emil Novák (born 1989), snowboarder
Robin Wagner (born 1993), cyclist

Twin towns – sister cities

Zábřeh is twinned with:
 Handlová, Slovakia
 Ochsenfurt, Germany

References

External links

Tourist Information Centre Zábřeh

Cities and towns in the Czech Republic
Populated places in Šumperk District